Monster Buster Club is a science fiction computer-animation television series co-produced by the French-based company Marathon Media, Canadian animation studio Image Entertainment Corporation and Jetix Europe. The show debuted on June 2, 2008, on Jetix in Europe, on June 9, 2008, in the United States, and in Asia on May 3, 2008. It premiered on YTV in Canada. It was shortly featured on the Disney Channel. Fifty-two episodes were produced.

Premise
This show is about three human pre-teens and their alien pre-teen friend, who are all charged with saving their town from alien invasions. They reform a secret organization that was founded centuries ago, the "Monster Buster Club," often abbreviated to MBC. The MBC aims to locate alien criminals hiding in Single Town, capture them, and send them to galactic authorities.

Setting
The show takes place in a small, sleepy town named Single Town. Single Town is two hundred years old and was founded by a man named "Addison Single," who is an evil alien in disguise. Unbeknownst to its human inhabitants, Single Town is a meeting place for aliens from different parts of the galaxy.

Episodes

Characters

Main

Cathy Smith (voiced by Andrea Libman) – Cathy appears to be a bubbly, 12-year-old girl on Earth, but she is a 250-year-old (or 700 Rhapsodian-year-old teenager) alien from the planet Rhapsodia. She came to Earth with her grandfather, Mr. Smith, to start the Monster Buster Club (MBC). She is constantly surprised at how different Earth is from Rhapsodia. She has many alien abilities, like the ability to stretch, slight telekinesis, and others. She is the  most optimus of the MBC. Her suit color is pink. In her human form, she has blond hair and blue eyes.  Her Rhapsodian form is shown to be a humanoid, white alien with scattered pink spots, with four tentacles for arms and two tentacles for legs, as well as tentacles on her head (like hair), and a long, furry-looking tail Compared to humans, Rhapsodians are incredibly long-lived.
Chris (voiced by Samuel Vincent) – Chris is the 12-year-old tech guy of the group. He has indigo-blue hair and dark blue eyes. He is brilliant, with a knack for gadgets. He'll often stay back in the clubhouse and supply intelligence reports while the rest of the group is on a mission. His suit color is blue.
Danny Jackson (voiced by Matt Hill) is a 12-year-old boy and a nice guy at heart. He's good at sports and has brown hair, green eyes, and a scar over his left eyebrow. He can get overconfident at times. He has an adamant crush on his schoolmate, Wendy. He has an erratic sense of humor and enjoys cracking jokes even in dangerous situations. He has his own self-proclaimed nickname: "The Danny," and refers to himself as such whenever he's performing a task. His suit color is red.
Sam (voiced by Anna Cummer) – Samantha, known by her friends as Sam, is a 12-year-old girl and is the most level-headed of the group with an often serious disposition. She has dark hair tied in buns and hazel eyes. Officially the MBC has no official leader, she'll often be the member to construct battle strategies and procedures for the group. She, at times, can be bossy. She possesses natural leadership.  She'll often put MBC first instead of having fun. She sometimes is the shoot first and asks questions later type. Her suit color is yellow.
John (voiced by Tabitha St. Germain) – John is Chris' 10-year-old little brother. He sometimes takes over for Chris at the clubhouse when Chris is on a mission or busy. He really wants to be in the MBC but he is too young.
Mr. Hugo Smith (voiced by Rick Jones) – Mr. Smith is Cathy's aloof grandfather and came with her to Earth. Like Cathy, he is a Rhapsodian but rarely displays any supernatural powers, and his alien form resembles a mollusk. He'll sometimes aid the MBC from the clubhouse, but often he won't be involved in their missions at all. Mr. Smith loves working in his garden and playing cards with his plants.

Other students
Wendy (voiced by Tabitha St. Germain) – Danny's crush, 13-year-old who is the snobby, popular valley girl at the school which the MBC attend. She is known for gossiping and tries anything to get a good scoop. (This is shown in the episode "Bubbleheads" when she follows Cathy to Mark's house because she thinks Cathy's working on another story.)
Jeremy Flablotnick (voiced by Samuel Vincent) A 12-year-old kid who is best friends with Chris. In "Flower King", he fell in love with Cathy and wanted to give her a flower, which was actually Petalia. Though, Cathy does not appear to return Jeremy's interest
Mark  (voiced by Ian James Corlett) A 13-year-old whom the richest boy in town and Danny's nemesis. He often calls him, "Danny-Wanny" since "Mindreader"

Faculty
Mr. Fusster (voiced by Ian James Corlett) – The MBC's science teacher who thinks aliens don't exist. This upsets extraterrestrial Cathy and she often argues with him on the subject, which gets her in trouble. Later events, though, show that he may know more about aliens than he lets on, and may even be one.
Principal Rollins (voiced by Sonja Ball) – The gang's principal who thinks the students are soldiers and often uses terms like "Company halt!" and "About face!". She sometimes gets in the way of the MBC's missions. She has shown in various episodes an affection for Mr. Smith. It is also suggested she used to be a spy, and believes Cathy is one too.

Others
Matisse, Wendy's dog.
Mr. Beatty runs the Happy Mart.

Broadcast
Besides Jetix internationally, the series has also been broadcast on several other networks.
In the United Kingdom, as well as Jetix, the series was aired on the GMTV-owned (Which Disney held a 25% stake in at the time) Toonattik strand, which itself aired on ITV1 and the CITV channel.
In the Arab World, the show was aired on MBC 3 and Al Jazeera Children's Channel (JCC)/Jeem TV, who aired other Jetix programming.
In Israel, the show was aired on Arutz HaYeladim.
In the rest of Asia (including the Middle East, the Indian subcontinent, Southeast Asia and Greater China), the show was aired on Disney Channel, who aired other Jetix programming.
In the Philippines, the show was aired on Q (now known as GTV).
In Indonesia, the show was aired on RTV.
In Hong Kong, the show was aired on the country's English speaking television network TVB Pearl.
In Singapore, the show as aired on the subscription video on demand service Toggle (now known as meWATCH).
In Malaysia, the show was aired on TV3 as part of their Bananana! programming block.
In Ireland, the show was aired on RTÉ2 as part of the long running children's strand The Den.

Notes

References

External links 
 Official Site
 Marathon Brings Monster to MIPCOM from animationmagazine.net
 Disney XD Official site
 

2000s Canadian animated television series
2008 Canadian television series debuts
2009 Canadian television series endings
2000s French animated television series
2008 French television series debuts
2009 French television series endings
Canadian children's animated action television series
Canadian children's animated adventure television series
Canadian children's animated comic science fiction television series
Canadian children's animated science fantasy television series
Canadian police procedural television series
Canadian computer-animated television series
French children's animated action television series
French children's animated adventure television series
French children's animated comic science fiction television series
French children's animated science fantasy television series
French computer-animated television series
French police procedural television series
Anime-influenced Western animated television series
English-language television shows
French-language television shows
YTV (Canadian TV channel) original programming
Jetix original programming
TF1 original programming
Television series by Image Entertainment Corporation
Television series by Banijay
Animated television series about children
Fictional police officers
2000s American police comedy television series